Freddy Manuel "Petroleo" García Loayza (born 22 November 1959) is a Peruvian football manager who most recently was the manager of Alfonso Ugarte in the Copa Perú.

Managerial career
Freddy García began his career as a manager in 1998 when he took charge of his home town club Deportivo Bolito. He quickly took them to 1st Division of Tacna.  Then in 2001 he took Bolito into the later stages of the Copa Perú, but was later replaced by Ítalo Herrera, who then went on to win the 2001 Copa Perú.  Now promoted to the top-flight, the club Sport Bolito changed its name to Coronel Bolognesi FC, and García was appointed assistant manager to Roberto Di Plácido. García would then be act as interem and assistant manager of the Tacna club from 2002 to 2006 and served as an assistant to up-and-coming managers like Roberto Mosquera and Jorge Sampaoli. Finally in the 2007 Torneo Descentralizado season he would have his chance as the head manager of Bolognesi in the Clausura.

Then in 2008 he managed Diablos Rojos de Juliaca and later Total Clean of the Peruvian Segunda División. García quickly found success with Total Clean by guiding them to promotion to the top-flight as the club finished as champions of the 2008 season.

In January 2009 García took charge of Segunda División club Deportivo Coopsol. He managed them in 2009 season but this time could not guide them to the Descentralizado.

Then he was hired as the new manager of Cobresol FBC in January 2010. He quickly found success again as he took the Moquegua club to top-flight for the first time as the club won the 2010 season. With the club in the Torneo Descentralizado, Petroleo did not continue as the manager of Cobresol.

García was then appointed manager of ambitious Cusco club Real Garcilaso in January 2011. Once again for the third time in his career he managed the newly formed club to the top-flight this time by finishing as champions of the 2011 Copa Perú. Under his managership he has taken Real Garcilaso to back to back national finals in 2012 and 2013 as well as the 2013 Copa Libertadores quarter-finals.

Honours

Managerial
 Total Clean
Peruvian Segunda División (1): 2008

 Cobresol FBC
Peruvian Segunda División (1): 2010

Real Garcilaso
Copa Perú (1): 2011
Torneo Descentralizado (Runner-up): 2012, 2013

References

External links
 

1959 births
Living people
People from Tacna
Peruvian football managers
Peruvian Primera División managers
Cienciano managers
Deportivo Binacional FC managers
Coronel Bolognesi managers
Cusco FC managers
León de Huánuco managers
Ayacucho FC managers